The women's 50 metre rifle three positions was a shooting sports event held as part of the Shooting at the 1984 Summer Olympics programme. It was the first time the event was held for women at the Olympics. The competition was held on August 2, 1984 at the shooting ranges in Los Angeles. 27 shooters from 17 nations competed.

Results

References

Shooting at the 1984 Summer Olympics
Olymp
Shoo
Women's 050m 3 positions 1984